John Polson (born 6 September 1965) is an Australian actor, director and founder of Tropfest.

As an actor, Polson's best known role is probably starring opposite Russell Crowe and Jack Thompson in The Sum of Us (1994).

In February 2001, Polson attended the 12th Yubari International Fantastic Film Festival in Hokkaidō, Japan, where his film Siam Sunset won the Minami Toshiko Award. In 2005 he directed the film Hide and Seek, which achieved number one box-office status in America. He also directed the feature film Tenderness starring Russell Crowe and Laura Dern, which was released in 2009.

Polson is the creative founder of Tropfest, the world's largest short film festival. In 2007, Tropfest partnered with the Tribeca Film Festival to present Tropfest@Tribeca in Battery Park. He is also a talented saxophone player. At the APRA Music Awards of 2013, Screen Music Awards ceremony he was presented with the International Achievement Award.

Filmography

As director

As actor

Video games

References

External links

Interview with John Polson on the best and worst ever Tropfest films on WHO.com
https://web.archive.org/web/20110722015227/http://www.tropfest.com/

1965 births
Living people
APRA Award winners
Australian film directors
Australian male film actors
Australian male television actors
Australian television directors
Best Supporting Actor AACTA Award winners
People educated at North Sydney Boys High School
Male actors from Sydney
Waldorf school alumni